Myron Anyfantakis (born 23 October 1939) is a Greek athlete. He competed in the men's javelin throw at the 1960 Summer Olympics.

References

External links
 

1939 births
Living people
Athletes (track and field) at the 1960 Summer Olympics
Greek male javelin throwers
Olympic athletes of Greece
Sportspeople from Rethymno
Mediterranean Games bronze medalists for Greece
Mediterranean Games medalists in athletics
Athletes (track and field) at the 1959 Mediterranean Games